José Ramón Leguizamón Ortega (born 21 August 1991) is a Paraguayan footballer who plays as a centre-back for Sol de América.

References

External links

José Leguizamón at WhoScored

1991 births
Living people
Paraguayan footballers
Paraguayan expatriate footballers
Association football defenders
Argentine Primera División players
Chilean Primera División players
Sportivo Luqueño players
Club Olimpia footballers
Rosario Central footballers
Unión Española footballers
Club Sol de América footballers
Central Córdoba de Santiago del Estero footballers
Paraguayan expatriate sportspeople in Chile
Paraguayan expatriate sportspeople in Argentina
Expatriate footballers in Chile
Expatriate footballers in Argentina